Bissau-Guinean Americans are Americans of Bissau-Guinean descent. As was the case with almost all current West African coastal countries (and some of Central Africa), the first people in the United States from present-day Guinea-Bissau were imported as slaves. Thus, in the 21st century, there are many African Americans who have discovered, through DNA analysis, they descend mainly or at least partly, from Bissau-Guinean enslaved people.

History 

Between the fifteenth and nineteenth centuries, Guinea-Bissau belonged to a wide region of West Africa now called Senegambia, a very important region in the slavery trade in Africa and that had, between other slave ports, Cacheu and Bissau, been occupied by the Portuguese from the late fifteenth century (as other African places). So, since the late 15th century and with the cooperation of some local tribes, the Portuguese not only entered into the slave trade, but also imported large numbers of Senegambians (primarily of Bissau and Cacheu) and other Africans to the Western Hemisphere via Cape Verde. The local African rulers in Guinea, who prospered greatly from the African slave trade, had no interest in allowing the Europeans any further inland than the fortified coastal settlements where the trading took place; Bissau, Cacheu and Bolama. The Portuguese, after buying slaves from African kings and aristocracies, sold them to the European merchants (Spanish, English, French, Dutch, Swedish).

So, it is estimated that of the approximately 388,000 African slaves who arrived in the modern United States, almost 92,000 (24 percent) were Senegambians, many of them from Bissau port. In the early decades of immigration to the Chesapeake bay before 1700, most of slaves were from Senegambia (almost 6,000), being about 31,000 people by the end of the forced migration and representing almost a third of all Senegambian slaves arrived in modern United States. About 45,000 Senegambians were settled in the coastal Low Country of The Carolinas and Georgia (where they were 21 percent of African slaves) and other over 7,000 were imported in northern colonies (forming about 28 percent of the total of slaves arrived there). Meanwhile, almost 9,000 Senegambians — although mostly Bambara or Mandinka people — were imported to the Gulf region, especially to Louisiana, where they were about 40 percent of the African slaves.

The slaves that arrived specifically from Bissau port came from ethnic groups such as Djolas, Papel, Bayotes, Fulbes, and Balantas and were imported to Georgia and the Gulf Coast. So, according to Justin Martin, slaves of day-present Guinea Bissau are some of the slaves who contributed to form the Gullah culture, mixing their culture and language with other peoples of African descent present there (and coming from places such as the current Senegal, Guinea, Sierra Leone, Liberia, and Angola). On 1841, the consul of Guinea Bissau, Ferdinand Gardner, reported a very important USA commerce de slaves in Cacheu-Bissau.

After the abolition of slavery, however, the number of Bissau-Guineans who came to the United States was very scarce. So, in the 2000 census, fewer than 300 people affirmed to be of Bissau-Guinean origin or descent.

See also
List of Bissau-Guineans
Cajuns
Jazz
Cashew
Djembe
Bissau-Guineans in Portugal
Guinea-Bissau–United States relations

References 

 
West Africans in the United States
Bissau-Guinean diaspora